The Lutetia 4.C.02 was a small V-4 two-stroke engine designed soon after World War II and intended to power light aircraft.

Design and development

Marcel Echard was an engine designer with a lifetime interest in two-strokes. His first such engine was built in 1911 and he began work on the 4.C.02 in 1949. By 1953 this engine had achieved its homologation and had been test-flown on a Jodel D.9. The Briffaud GB-6 is the only known application, a one-off aircraft with a short life, though not because of its engine.

Unusually for a two-stroke, the fuel/air mixture was compressed externally rather than in the crankcase.

Applications
Briffaud GB-6

Specifications

References

V4 engines
Two-stroke aircraft piston engines
1940s aircraft piston engines